Disney Wonder is a cruise ship operated by Disney Cruise Line. She was the second ship to join the Disney fleet on entering service in 1999. The interior of Disney Wonder is decorated in the Art Nouveau style, in contrast to her sister ship, Disney Magic which is decorated in the Art Deco style. Both ships have 11 public decks, can accommodate 2,400 passengers in 875 staterooms, and have a crew of approximately 950. Disney Wonder was built in the year following completion of Disney Magic. , Disney Wonder sails various North American itineraries on a seasonal basis. From early September to late October 2016, the ship underwent dry dock in Cadiz, Spain where she was given many new dining, entertainment, and accommodation enhancements.

In 2022, it was confirmed that Disney Wonder would establish a new itinerary from Australia sailing to other parts of Oceania during their summer season. She will position to Sydney via Hawaii in October 2023 and return to Vancouver in March 2024.

History 

Disney had cruise ship designs drawn up by February 1994. She was laid down on May 5, 1997, launched on February 23, 1998, and completed on June 18, 1999. The ship's godmother was Disney character Tinkerbell (who only spoke with bell sounds), and Mickey Mouse (voiced by Wayne Allwine) gave the ship's blessing in English. Wonder entered into service in August 1999.

Disney Wonder originally sailed three- and four-night cruises to the Bahamas. In 2011,  took over these itineraries. Since then, the Disney Wonder has been sailing a variety of itineraries that include stops in Alaska, the Mexican Riviera, Hawaii, the Caribbean, and passages through the Panama Canal.

Rebecca Coriam, a 24-year-old crew member, was last seen by one of Disney Wonders security cameras having an apparently upsetting telephone conversation in the early morning hours of March 22, 2011, before apparently disappearing the next day. It was the first such incident in the history of Disney Cruise Lines.

With the arrival of Disney Dream in 2011, Disney Wonder was relocated to Los Angeles under a two-year contract with a three-year extension with the port.

On January 10, 2013, the ship made her first-call ceremony in Miami, Florida. Cruises while stationed in Miami would consist of four- and five-night itineraries to the Bahamas and Western Caribbean with stops in Cozumel, Mexico; Disney's private island, Castaway Cay; Grand Cayman; Key West and Nassau, Bahamas. The Disney Wonder returned in April 2013 to Vancouver, British Columbia, for Alaskan cruises.

The ship was dry docked for an overhaul at the Navantia shipyard in Cadiz, Spain in September 2016 until October 23, 2016. Disney Wonder was then stationed out of Galveston, Texas starting November 10, 2016.

In October 2018, Disney Cruise Line began showing Disney at Sea with D23, a 30-minute entertainment news show that covers the many Disney subsidiaries with input from D23, starting with Disney Wonder.

A cruise in spring 2020 was shortened by the COVID-19 pandemic. The ship arrived at the Port of San Diego, California, on March 19, 2020, where 1,980 passengers disembarked; there were no reports that any had flu-like symptoms. By April 5, 38 crew members had reportedly tested positive to the SARS-CoV-2 coronavirus, according to a report by Cruise Law News based on discussions with unnamed individuals on the ship. Disney, however, told other news media that none of the crew had tested positive. A passenger who disembarked at San Diego on March 20 reported that no health screening activities, such as the asking of health-related questions or the taking of temperatures, had occurred upon disembarkation, and that the only health screening that occurred was during the check-in process two weeks prior. After disembarking the passengers in March the ship was placed under a no-sail order, effective through July, by the Centers for Disease Control. As of May 2020 Disney Wonder and two other cruise ships were still at anchor offshore from San Diego. Approximately 700 crew were reportedly still aboard Disney Wonder.

After the resumption of cruising in October 2021, Disney Wonder made sailing short cruises from San Diego, Galveston, and New Orleans, Louisiana, with a significantly reduced passenger load.

On March 31, 2022, the Disney Wonder made its inaugural trip to Avalon, Catalina Island on a 4-night cruise, also stopping at Ensenada. This was celebrated in accordance with maritime tradition plaque exchanges.

Recreation

Entertainment 
Entertainment on Disney Wonder includes live Broadway-style shows with many Disney characters at the Walt Disney Theater, the Buena Vista movie theater, which features both Disney films and first-run movies, several night clubs and lounges, several pools, and many Disney-themed parties and celebrations, including a Sail-Away Celebration, Pirate Night, and sometimes a Marvel or Star Wars Day at Sea.

On the ship's forward funnel, there is a 24-by-14 foot LED screen known as the Funnel Vision, due to its location on the rear of one of the ship's funnels, where guests can watch various movies and shows either from the deck or from inside Goofy's Pool.

Youth Activities 
Children 3-12 can spend time at the Oceaneer Club and the Oceaneer Lab, which are connected by a passageway. The Club provides a slide, multiple TVs, dress up clothing, and counselor-led activities. The Lab provides video games, computers, cooking classes, and TV time geared towards the older end of that age bracket. Children receive an RFID badge when registered that allows the cruise staff to know the child's location in the activity areas, and to help with Check-in and Checkout. Tweens ages 11–14 can enjoy the Edge on deck 9, where they can watch movies, play games, enjoy arts and crafts and more with other cruisers their age. Finally, the Vibe exists in the funnel on deck 11 for teens ages 14–17, where they can chill, hang out with friends, listen to music, watch TV, play group games, and more.

For adults, one of the ship's three pools is reserved exclusively for older guests to relax and spend time, featuring a poolside bar and a number of deck chairs. There is also a shipboard spa at the front of the ship, past the adult pool, as well as a gym.  There are also adults-only activities, including limited alcohol tastings, trivia, and other activities in the After Hours section of the ship, which becomes adults-only after 9pm.

The ship also has a promenade/walking track around the exterior on deck four. On some cruisings, there are fireworks at sea on one night of the cruise, as well as a Pirate Night and/or Star Wars/Marvel Day at Sea.

Dining 
Disney Cruise line is known for pioneering the rotational dining setup, in which guests and their wait staff rotate through three differently themed restaurants throughout their cruise. The Disney Wonder's restaurants include Triton's (serving "continental food with a french flair"), Tiana's Place (serving southern-, cajun-, and creole-inspired food), and Animator's Palate (which is present on each of the original 4 Disney cruise ships). Additionally, the up-scale, adults-only restaurant Palo, situated at the rear of the ship, requires a separate reservation and serves high-end Italian cuisine.

References

External links 

Disney Wonder from the company's website

1999 ships
Panamax cruise ships
Ships built by Fincantieri
Ships of Disney Cruise Line